QPP may refer to:
 Quadratic permutation polynomial
 Quebec Pension Plan (QPP)
 Queensland People's Party
 Sûreté du Québec, sometimes referred to in English as "Quebec Provincial Police"